Andrew Tarimo (born in Kilimanjaro, Tanzania) is a Tanzanian academic professor and researcher who is specialized in irrigation engineering and water management systems. He is also providing lectures and supervision at the Sokoine University of Agriculture Department of Engineering Sciences and Technology, previously the Department of Agriculture Engineering and Land Planning.

Selected works

See also

References

External links

 Google Scholar Profile

Living people
Tanzanian engineers
People from Kilimanjaro Region
Year of birth missing (living people)
Sokoine University of Agriculture